Buricodava was a Dacian town.

See also 
 Dacian davae
 List of ancient cities in Thrace and Dacia
 Dacia
 Roman Dacia

Notes

References

Ancient

Modern

Further reading

External links 

Dacian towns

ro:Dacian town